The Sepik Hill languages form the largest and most ramified branch of the Sepik languages of northern Papua New Guinea. They are spoken along the southern margin of the Sepik floodplain in the foothills of Central Range of south-central East Sepik Province.

Languages
The languages according to Usher (2020) are,

Sepik Hills
Saniyo-Hiyewe
Southwest Sepik Hills: Niksek (Paka, Gabiano), Piame, Hewa
Bahinemo–Berinomo 
East Sepik Hills (Alamblak etc.)

The languages according to Foley (2018) are:

Sepik Hill
Eastern (Alamblak etc.)
Central (Bahinemo etc.)
Western: Saniyo-Hiyewe, Paka (Setiali), Gabiano (Niksek), Piame, Bikaru, Umairof, Hewa

Other than disagreement at to what is a language or a dialect (Glottolog, for example, concludes that the 'Bikaru' language is probably spurious, and doesn't list Umairof at all), the only difference from Usher is in combining Sanio with the Southwest Sepik Hills languages as a Western branch.

Pronouns
Pronouns in Sepik Hill languages:

{| 
! pronoun !! Sare !! Alamblak !! Saniyo-Hiyewe
|-
! 1sg
| an || na || ane
|-
! 2sg
| nɨ || ni || ne
|-
! 3sg.m
| rɨ || rər || rei
|-
! 3sg.f
| sɨ || rət || 
|-
! 1du
| nond || nə || noto-(si)
|-
! 2du
| fin || nifɨn || fene-si
|-
! 3du
| fɨ || rəf || rowe-si
|-
! 1pl
| nom || nəm || nomo
|-
! 2pl
| mɨ || nikə(m) || fene
|-
! 3pl
| rom || rəm || rowe
|}

Vocabulary comparison
The following basic vocabulary words are from Davies & Comrie (1985), Dye et al. (1968), Foley (2005), Macdonald (1973), and various SIL field notes, as cited in the Trans-New Guinea database:

{| class="wikitable sortable"
! Language !! Alamblak !! Bahinemo !! Berinomo !! Bisis !! Kapriman !! Bikaru !! Saniyo-Hiyewe
|-
! head
| mʌbogath; mɛ̈ƀɨǥatʰ || thu || tu tɛpi || tuʔus || toɣo || ʔambu; yowidi 'hɔřise || tu; worɛ siyaʔi
|-
! hair
| tʰɨ'maʀ̌č; tʌmarts; tʰɨ'maʀ̌š || thunʌba || to towa; tu sowa || tuam || tuwam || nɨmbɨ; yowididise || mato towe; tutowe
|-
! ear
| yimbɣindang; yɩmbɨǥin'daŋgɨtʰ; yɩmbʌlindangʌm || bʌsiya || pɛnɛhax || wanbatal || womblaja || haři; waʔaʌ || apahɛ; apaniyɛ
|-
! eye
| ɲinga; 'ɲiŋgaʀ̥̥̌; ningaw || niya || niya || nika || nikha || mɨn 'taʔamɨ; tařa || nihe; nihɛ
|-
! nose
| 'hʰušɨ ɨtʰ; khusɩmʌth; 'kʰučɨmɨtʰ; kusm || sɛkʌnɩ || ɛrɛm || sikʌľap̶ar || singova || taʔama; towi || ɛrɛme; ɛrɛmɛ
|-
! tooth
| bɩ'čɛ̈tʰ; biʃə; bɩ'šɛ̈tʰ; bɩsʌm || pi || pi || binikam || bim || ne; nɨmbi || pi
|-
! tongue
| tor; torkh; 'tʰoʀ̥̌tʰ || thɔlu || tor || toguʌl || thʌdɩs || ketasi; tɨgalɨ || sořowɛ; soruwɛ
|-
! leg
| wʌlat; 'wɷ'řatʰ; wura || lowa || rowa hɛna || wɛlis || wola ||  || lowe; rowɛ
|-
! louse
| nəm; 'nɛ̈mɨtʰ; nʌmo || nʌmu || tu nɛm || ninis || nʌmɩs || aƀʌkʰ; lema || nɛmɛ
|-
! dog
| yauʀ̥̌ʸ; yawi; yawu || yo || yao || yau || yom || waʔšɨ; waʔšʌ; wina || yo; you
|-
! pig
| 'ᵽɛ̈gɨʀ̥̌; fagʌr; fəɣ || fa || hɛ || p̶oʔol || fʌɣr ||  || fe
|-
! bird
| nongwar; 'nugwaʀ̥̌ || wabo || uro || nuŋgař || yerɛpm || heka; namʷio; waʔaƀi || iřowɛ; iruwɛ
|-
! egg
| fɣa; fokam; ᵽo'ǥat || wabo mu || uro wɛka || nuŋgwawobom || yuɣwar || heře akia; mbandung || hotɛ
|-
! blood
| khukhupam; kɨ'kʰupʰam || mahələ || marɛ hax || kukwem || kokwem || gugubase || fisa'i; fisaʔi
|-
! bone
| thʌphim; tɨ'pɩʀ̥̌; tɨpi || hʌbi || sɛtsɛpi || sɩbɩkʰam || sibevam || hɔři || paʔaře; pa'arɛ
|-
! skin
| tʰɨ'ǥatʰ; thʌkhath || thʌbi || tepi || tibi || thʌgas || ha'baisi; nbangɨ || tahɛ
|-
! breast
| mingam; miŋatʰ; niŋgam || mosu || mok || minika || mʌnikha || ařu'se:; muña || mo'u; moʔu
|-
! tree
| mᵼč; mim; mᵼš; mɨy || mi || mɛ || mom || mə || mi; sia || me; mɛ
|-
! man
| yima; 'yi'maʀ̥̌ || 'ɩma || muwɛ pɛhɛnɛ || nimař || wiyak || ntu; wɔbi || mɛni; mitaru
|-
! woman
| 'metɨtʰ7; metum || swani || mesan || toʔanʌs || toɣwan || taʔagwa; wita || taunɛ; tawnɛ
|-
! sun
| mar; 'mařɨʀ̥̌ || tɩniya || teniya || maľɛľɛl || yɛneza || ñʌ; yaki || poɔyuɛ; poweyɛ
|-
! moon
| yam; 'yamɨtʰ; yamʌth || yamal || nop || yaguso || yagos || babume; mpaʔopmu || yamɛ; yamɛ'
|-
! water
| bukbam; 'bupʰam; bu-pam || hagi || saʔ || sagim || sagim || eipa; ngu || sa'i; saʔi
|-
! fire
| kaɣ; kʰaǥɨtʰ; khaxth || ya || itai || yoʔoy || moyos || ʔiya; sea || yɛhɛ
|-
! stone
| tʰaǥᵗč|š; taxim || ba || pa || obak || obar || hana; tumbu || tapiyɛ
|-
! road, path
| yɨ'ǥotʸoǥatʰ ||  || yo || ʔatʰoř ||  || yaʔambu; yəřo; yəto || 
|-
! name
| 'yuƀatʰ; yufa; yufat || wufa || wiyapa ||  || ovas ||  || yapɛ
|-
! eat
| fa; ka; 'kʰaɛ̈ʀ̥̌; weyanum; ye || diyaw ||  || bʌľia̠s || asoliya || ʔagʌnʌ || aiyei; asiyʌ
|-
! one
| rɛphar; rpa; řɨpʰatʰ || dʌbatha || tɛpa || tabak || dɩbar || kɨtʌkʰ; yoko habia || hɛta'i; taʔi
|-
! two
| hutsif; xočiᵽ; 'xošɩᵽ || husi || howis || wɩtɩp || kothi || ƀɩtik; yoko labo || hɛsi
|}

References

 

 
Sepik languages